The 1904 Wabash College football team was an American football team that represented Wabash College during the 1904 college football season. In Frank Cayou's first season as head coach, the team compiled a 4–4 record. This was the year Wabash adopted the Little Giants name.

Schedule

References

Wabash
Wabash Little Giants football seasons
Wabash football